Ludington High School (LHS) is a public secondary school in Ludington, Michigan, United States. It serves grades 9–12 for the Ludington Area Schools district of Mason County.

Demographics 
The demographic breakdown of the 685 students enrolled at LHS in 2020–21 was:

 Male - 49.4%
 Female - 50.6%
 Native American - 0.3%
 Asian - 1.0%
 Black - 1.2%
 Hispanic - 9.9%
 Pacific Islander - 0.1%
 White - 82.5%
 Multiracial - 5.0%

In addition, 260 students (38%) were eligible for reduced-price or free lunch.

References 

Public high schools in Michigan
Education in Mason County, Michigan
1880 establishments in Michigan